A wrist piercing is a piercing through the surface of the wrist, first popularized by Jon Cobb in PFIQ.  Wrist piercings are a type of surface piercing. 
They carry a high rate of rejection and migration, unless they are properly measured and placed.  The piercings may be rejected if they are not installed properly; due to the location of the piercings they are easy to irritate, and regularly catch onto clothing or other objects.
People with wrist piercings are advised to put on short sleeved t-shirts, singlets so as to prevent the surface barbell from catching onto the threads of the clothing. Also, wrist piercings can only be done with a special tool (to hook the other side of the surface barbell upside) and thus, it is of high difficulty for it to be home-made.
Piercers would also advise that, after getting a wrist piercing, the person is to soak and moisten the wound with mild salted solution so as to disinfect the area, preventing bacteria from entering the unclotted wound. The span of a wrist piercing ranges approximately from as short as 2 weeks to 6 or 7 months.

Wrist Piercing Jewelry
As with all surface piercings, wrist piercings require special jewelry to minimize the risk of piercing migration and rejection.  Both surface bars and barbells with bars made from flexible material, such as tygon or Teflon, are commonly used as both short and long term jewelry in wrist piercings. More appropriate is titanium, which is less likely to irritate surrounding skin due to its lack of nickel. A quality piercing is done in two steps with different bars: one with long rises used at time of piercing to allow for initial swelling, and a second bar with shorter rises and balls a few millimeters from skin to be inserted months later once healing has taken place. Other jewelry includes specially made and bent barbells, which may be made by the piercer or can be ordered from a dealer.

References

Surface piercings